Tolga Güleç (born 20 September 1981) is a Turkish actor. He started studying Business Administration at the Çukurova University. However, he decided to pursue a different path in fine arts and left Çukurova University to study and graduate from Dokuz Eylül University's Faculty of Fine Arts Theater Department, Acting Department.

Filmography 
 2022: Erkek Severse (Hakan)
 2021: Masumiyet (Timur Yüksel)
 2020: Kırmızı Oda
 2019: Kızım Gibi Kokuyorsun (Mustafa)
 2019: Leke (Mehmet Tuna)
 2019: Yüzleşme (Tunç)
 2017: Fazilet Hanım ve Kızları (Gökhan Egemen)
 2016: Poyraz Karayel (Neşet Topal)
 2015: Son Çıkış (Cesur)
 2014: Hayat Ağacı (Kenan)
 2013–2014: Adını Kalbime Yazdım (Halil)
 2010: Öyle Bir Geçer Zaman Ki
 2009: Cin Geçidi (Cinema)
 2008: Gece Gündüz (TV series) (9th episode)
 2008: Hatırla Sevgili (TV series)
 2006–2007: Kırık Kanatlar (TV series)
 2005–2006: Misi (TV series)
 2003–2004: Portakal Suyu (short film)
 2003–2004: Maça Beşli Müzik Grubu 40.Yıl Kutlamaları (music video)

Theatre 
 2009: Chamaco (Abel Gonzalez Melo)
 2009: Roberto Zucco (Bernard Marie Koltes)
 2008: Küçük Adam Ne Oldu Sana (Hans Fallada)
 2006–2007: İnsandan Kaçan (Molière)
 2005–2006: Yer Demir Gök Bakır (Yaşar Kemal)
 2005–2006: Zifir ve Şevder
 2004–2005: Yaşama Dokunamayanlar Çadırı
 2004–2005: Cadı Kazanı (Arthur Miller)
 2003–2004: Richard III (W. Shakespeare)
 2003–2004: Oyunun Oyunu (Michael Frayn)
 2002–2003: Toros Canavarı (İzmir state theater)
 2001–2002: Öykülerin Azizliği (İzmir state theater)

References

External links 
 

1981 births
Living people
Turkish male film actors
Turkish male stage actors
21st-century Turkish male actors